In electric power distribution, a bus duct (also called busway) is a sheet metal duct or also cast resin insulated containing either copper or aluminium busbars for the purpose of conducting a substantial current of electricity. It is an alternative means of conducting electricity to power cables or cable bus.

Originally a busway consisted of bare copper conductors supported on inorganic insulators, such as porcelain, mounted within a non-ventilated steel housing.

History
Busways were produced due to request of the automotive industry in Detroit in the late 1920s. Since that time, busways improved and became an integrated part of secondary network for industrial plants.

Construction

Similar to cable tray, bus ducts have thicker, cold-formed steel side rails and thinner sheet metal coverings. Busbars inside may be separated with distinct and even gaps between them, or “sandwiched” together.

Typically, individual busbars are wrapped or coated with a non-conducting, covalent material, such as plastic or (in older systems) electrical tape.

At the connection point, busbars flare out to enable connection to the next segment.

A plug-in bus duct system or busway can have disconnect switches and other devices mounted on it, for example, to distribute power along a long building. Many forms of busway allow plug-in devices such as switches and motor starters to be easily moved; this provides flexibility for changes on an assembly line, for example.

Feeder busway is used to interconnect equipment, such as between a transformer and a switchgear line up.  A variant type is a low-impedance busway, which is designed to have lower voltage drop by virtue of close spacing of bus bars, which reduces inductive reactance. 
 
A trolley busway provides power to equipment that must be frequently moved.  The busway is open at the bottom, and a movable collector assembly "trolley" is used to connect between the fixed bus bars in the busway and the cable connected to moving equipment.
Bus ducts are building service penetrants that are required to be externally firestopped where they penetrate fire separations required to have a fire-resistance rating.

See also 
 Bus (computing)
 Busbar
 Isolated-phase bus
 Duct (flow)

References

External links

 Merriam Webster Definition of Bus Duct
 YouTube Bus Duct Installation
 YouTube Bus Duct Construction and Installation
 Underwriters Laboratories Standard UL857 abstract
 IEEE C37.23 Standard For Metal Enclosed Bus
 Interpretations for IEEE Std C37.23-1987 IEEE Guide for Metal-Enclosed Bus and Calculating Losses in Isolated-Phase Bus
 IEEE P3004.7 - Recommended Practice for the Protection of Power Cables and Busway Used in Industrial and Commercial Power Systems
 IEEE Busway Short Circuit Testing Procedures
 IEEE Mathematical model of high voltage sandwich bus duct

Electric power systems components
Electrical wiring